Kaptol is a village and a municipality in central Slavonia, Croatia. It is located on the slopes of Papuk mountain, east of Velika and northeast of Požega. The population of the municipality is 3,472, with 1,409 people in Kaptol itself, 97% are Croats (census 2001).

References

External links
 

Slavonia
Municipalities of Croatia
Populated places in Požega-Slavonia County